Merlin Devere Tuttle (born August 26, 1941) is an American ecologist, conservationist, writer and wildlife photographer who has specialized in bat ecology, behavior, and conservation. He is credited with protecting the Austin Congress Avenue Bridge bat colony from extermination. Tuttle is currently active as founder and executive director of Merlin Tuttle's Bat Conservation (MTBC) in Austin, Texas.

He also founded the conservation organizations Bat Conservation International, from which he retired in 2009, and helped establish the National Park of American Samoa. Tuttle has also published research on gray bat population ecology migration, and the frog-eating bats Trachops cirrhosus.

Tuttle's photography of bats has been featured in numerous National Geographic Society publications, including 100 Best Pictures and 100 Years of Adventure and Discovery. In 2002, the United States Postal Service released a commemorative stamp series featuring Tuttle's photographs. In 2019, Tuttle served as science editor and photographer for the Smithsonian Books publication BATS: an illustrated guide to all species. He has received accolades for his research and conservation work, including the Gerritt S. Miller Jr. Award, and has been honored by the Texas State House of Representatives.

In 2015, Tuttle published his memoir, The Secret Lives of Bats: My Adventures With the World’s Most Misunderstood Mammals.

Early life

Tuttle was born in Honolulu, Hawaii. According to his autobiography The Secret Lives of Bats, he has always been fascinated by nature for as long as he can remember. He was raised around Knoxville, Tennessee with his two siblings and parents Horace and June Tuttle. In April 1959 at age 17, Tuttle learned of a bat cave near his home in Knoxville. After convincing his father to venture into the cave with him, he found himself surrounded by a swarm of gray bats while climbing through a hole that served as the bat's exit route. He describes this as his introduction to the gentle nature of bats, which did not scratch or bite him as they swarmed around him attempting to exit the cave. Curious about where the bats traveled after they emerged from the cave, Tuttle repeatedly returned with his parents to watch them emerge and noticed that they disappeared for months at a time. Despite reading in textbooks that gray bats were non-migratory, he became convinced by his observations that the bats must be migrating during these periods of absence. After documenting field notes and collecting two museum-type specimens from the cave, Tuttle's mother drove him to meet with scientists from the Smithsonian's Division of Mammals in Washington, D.C., who equipped him with several thousand bat bands for him to track the gray bat movements. This experience served as Tuttle's introduction to bat research.

Education

Tuttle earned a Bachelor of Arts degree in zoology from Andrews University, located in Berrien Springs, Michigan. He then entered graduate school at the University of Kansas, where he studied systematics, ecology, and evolution. His master's thesis focused on zoogeography of Peruvian bats. He obtained his Ph.D in 1974, completing his dissertation on population ecology and migration of gray bats. He subsequently published several academic papers based on his research, as well as numerous books about bats (many of which are aimed at lay readers).

Career

Smithsonian Venezuelan Project 
In 1965, Tuttle was hired by the U.S. Army and the Smithsonian Institution to co-direct an expedition into the Amazonian Rainforest territory of Venezuela. The project, coordinated by Charles O. Handley, Jr., curator of mammals at National Museum of Natural History, was intended to collect a large, representative sample of Venezuelan mammals and their ectoparasites in order to study mammal-parasite-habitat relationships.

Ann W. Richards Congress Avenue Bridge 

In March 1986, Tuttle resigned from his position as Curator of Mammals at the Milwaukee Public Museum in Wisconsin and relocated his fledgling conservation organization, Bat Conservation International, to Austin, which had been making national headline news for its urban bat population. At the time, the Ann W. Richards Congress Avenue Bridge bats were widely unpopular and the colony was at risk of extermination. Tuttle's public education campaign to save the bats through dispelling myths and misconceptions about their threats to the citizens of Austin was met with widespread skepticism and earned him the 1986 Texas Monthly Bum Steer Award. However, with help from a coalition of leaders in the Austin community, the Public Health Department, and news media, Tuttle's persistent education efforts successfully reversed public opinion about the bats and turned the Congress Avenue Bridge bat colony into the highly-profitable tourist attraction for the city of Austin that it is today.

National Park of American Samoa 

In 1985, BCI trustees Verne and Marion Read, Paul Cox, a professor of botany at Brigham Young University and Tuttle traveled to American Samoa to investigate the decline of Samoan Flying Fox populations due to the decimation of their habitat and commercial hunting. Their work evolved into a successful two-year initiative to create the National Park of American Samoa with the aid of American Samoa Governor A.P. Lutali, Lt. Governor Eni Hunkin, Samoan chiefs and a coalition of legislators and supporters. On October 31, 1988, U.S. President Ronald Reagan signed the Samoan park bill into law, establishing the first-ever tropical rainforest protected by the U.S. National Park Service and included 8,500 acres of pristine rainforest, coastal habitat, and coral atolls.

Selected bibliography

Notes

References

External links
Merlin Tuttle's Bat Conservation Website

1941 births
Living people
American conservationists
American ecologists
American photographers
Animal cognition writers
People from Honolulu